Foreign exchange controls are various forms of controls imposed by a government on the purchase/sale of foreign currencies by residents, on the purchase/sale of local currency by nonresidents, or the transfers of any currency across national borders. These controls allow countries to better manage their economies by controlling the inflow and outflow of currency, which may otherwise create exchange rate volatility. Countries with weak and/or developing economies generally use foreign exchange controls to limit speculation against their currencies. They may also introduce capital controls, which limit foreign investment in the country.

Rationale 

Common foreign exchange controls include:

 banning the use of foreign currency within the country;
 banning locals from possessing foreign currency;
 restricting currency exchange to government-approved exchangers;
 fixed exchange rates
 restricting the amount of currency that may be imported or exported;

Often, foreign exchange controls can result in the creation of black markets in currencies. This leads to a situation where the actual demand for foreign currency is greater than that which is available on the official market. As such, it is unclear whether governments have the ability to enact effective exchange controls.

History 

Foreign exchange controls used to be common in most countries. For instance, many western European countries implemented exchange controls in the years immediately following World War II. The measures were gradually phased out, however, as the post-war economies on the continent steadily strengthened; the United Kingdom, for example, removed the last of its restrictions in October 1979. By the 1990s, there was a trend toward free trade and globalization and economic liberalization.

In France, exchange controls started after the First World War. It then reappeared between 1939 and 1967. After a very short interruption, exchange controls were restored in 1968, relaxed in 1984, and finally abolished in 1989.

Francoist Spain kept foreign exchange controls from the Spanish Civil War to the 1970s.

Other countries that formerly had exchange controls in the modern period include:

 Argentina - between 2011 and 2015, and from 2020
 Egypt - until 1995
 Finland - until 1990
 Israel - until 1994
 Taiwan - until 1987
 United Kingdom - until 1979

Current examples 

Today, countries with foreign exchange controls are known as "Article 14 countries", after the provision in the International Monetary Fund's Articles of Agreement, which allows exchange controls only for "transitional economies".

 Algeria
 Angola
 Argentina
 Armenia
 Bahamas
 Barbados
 Belarus
 Cameroon
 China
 Cuba
 Ethiopia
 Ghana
 India
 Iran
 Libya
 Morocco
 Myanmar
 Mozambique
 Namibia
 Nepal
 Nigeria
 North Korea
 Russia
 Samoa
 South Africa
 Sudan
 Tunisia
 Ukraine
 Uzbekistan
 Venezuela
 Zimbabwe

See also

 Currency transaction tax
 Financial transaction tax
 Spahn tax
 Sterling Area
 Tobin tax

References 

Foreign direct investment
Monetary hegemony
Price controls
Protectionism